General Constand Laubscher Viljoen,  (28 October 1933 – 3 April 2020) was a South African military commander and politician. He co-founded the Afrikaner Volksfront (Afrikaner People's Front) and later founded the Freedom Front (now Freedom Front Plus). He is partly credited with having prevented the outbreak of armed violence by disaffected white South Africans prior to post-apartheid general elections.

Military service
Viljoen matriculated at Standerton High School in 1951. He joined South Africa's pre-republic Union Defence Force in 1956 upon receiving a degree in military science at the University of Pretoria. By 1974, Viljoen had been named the South African Army's Director of General Operations, subsequently serving as the Principal Staff Officer to the Chief of the South African Defence Force. He was appointed as Chief of the Army in 1977 and succeeded General Magnus Malan as Chief of the South African Defence Force in 1980.

Angolan service
Viljoen was the senior SADF military officer directing Operation Savannah in 1975. He is also credited with having planned the first major airborne assault in South African military history, Cassinga, a raid carried out against SWAPO insurgents. Despite his rank, Viljoen was present during the battle, offering what was described as a "swashbuckling" front-line leadership, which won him the respect of many fellow Soldiers.

Political career
Viljoen is credited by some with having made overtures which helped lead to white South Africans' acceptance of universal suffrage and free elections, such as with his famous speech at the Broederbond annual assembly in Voortrekkerhoogte, saying of the black South Africans in his army, "As hulle kan veg vir Suid-Afrika, kan hulle stem vir Suid-Afrika!" (Afrikaans: "If they can fight for South Africa, then they can vote for South Africa!").

In 1993, Viljoen and fellow retired generals formed the Afrikaner Volksfront (Afrikaner People's Front), an umbrella body for conservative Afrikaners. However, Viljoen reportedly had strained relationships with the leaders of other right-wing parties, who considered him too moderate.

Bophuthatswana action and decision to contest elections

Immediately prior to the 1994 general elections Viljoen had a force of between 50,000 and 60,000 trained paramilitary personnel at his command, with the ability to seize large sections of the country. The force was assembled in preparation for war with Umkhonto we Sizwe, the military wing of the African National Congress (ANC), as a potential contingency to protect Afrikaner interests.

In March 1994, Viljoen led an effort by several thousand Volksfront militia to protect the bantustan president, Lucas Mangope, in Bophuthatswana against a coup d'état. Despite being requested not to participate in the action because of extremist views, militants of the Afrikaner Weerstandsbeweging also advanced into Bophuthatswana, sparking clashes with the security forces.

Immediately after the incident, Viljoen split from the Volksfront and initiated a legitimate election campaign, co-founding and becoming leader of the Freedom Front (Vryheidsfront), a new political party representing white conservatives. His decision to take part in the elections is believed to have prevented armed resistance by the far right and on the occasion of his retirement from politics, the South African government recognised him for preventing bloodshed.

Viljoen's decision was at least partly influenced by the mediation of his identical twin brother, Abraham Viljoen (Braam), who was an anti-apartheid activist while his brother led the military.

In post-apartheid South Africa
In the 1994 general election, the Freedom Front, under the leadership of Viljoen, received 2.2% of the national vote and nine seats in the National Assembly. As the VF became the strongest party outside Nelson Mandela's Government of National Unity, as the provisional 1993 Constitution required the participation of all parties over 5% of the vote, Viljoen technically became the Head of the Opposition in South Africa until the NP's departure from government in 1996. 

Although his supporters were at odds with the government and the ANC, Viljoen praised Mandela on the occasion of his retirement from politics in 1999, even ending his Parliamentary speech speaking in Mandela's native language, Xhosa: Go and have yourself a well-earned rest. Go rest in the shadow of a tree at your home.

In 2001, Viljoen handed over the leadership of the Freedom Front to Pieter Mulder and retired from politics, citing his frustration working with a parliament dominated by the ANC.

After retirement
In 2003, it emerged that Viljoen had been a target of the Boeremag paramilitary right-wing group, which considered him a traitor who had underhandedly sold out the Afrikaner people.

In 2008 Viljoen, aged 74, put up what was described as a spirited fight against two would-be muggers, who were subsequently arrested.

Death
Current Freedom Front Plus leader Pieter Groenewald announced on 3 April 2020 that Viljoen had died on his farm in Ohrigstad, Mpumalanga. He was 86 and was surrounded by his children. Viljoen died of natural causes.

He is survived by his wife Christina Susanna Heckroodt, four sons and a daughter.

Awards and decorations

References

|-

|-

|-

|-

|-

|-

|-

|-

1933 births
2020 deaths
People from Standerton
Afrikaner people
South African people of Dutch descent
South African anti-communists
Members of the Dutch Reformed Church in South Africa
Chiefs of the South African Army
South African military personnel of the Border War
Freedom Front Plus politicians